The 1935 season of the Mitropa Cup football club tournament was won by Sparta Prague who defeated Ferencváros 4–2 on aggregate in the final. It was Sparta's second victory in the competition, having won the inaugural competition in 1927. The two legs of the final were played on 8 September and 15 September.

This was the ninth edition of the tournament. Holders AGC Bologna failed to qualify for the competition.

First round

|}

Quarterfinals

|}
a Match decided by play off.

Quarterfinal play off

|}

Semifinals

|}
a Match decided by play off.

Semifinal play-off

|}

Finals

|}

Top goalscorers

External links

References

1935–36
1935–36 in European football
1935–36 in Austrian football
1935–36 in Italian football
1935–36 in Czechoslovak football
1935–36 in Hungarian football